Afshin Habibzadeh is an Iranian workers' rights activist and reformist politician. He currently serves as an alternative member in the City Council of Tehran and is elected for a seat in the upcoming term of the council.

References

Living people
Islamic Labour Party politicians
Worker House members
Tehran Councillors 2017–
Year of birth missing (living people)